Roland Forthomme (born 3 November 1970) is a Belgian carom billiards player. He won twice at the Three-Cushion World Cup from 2005 to 2006. Forthomme got into second place five times and third place twice at the Three-Cushion World Cup from 2007 to 2019. In 2012, he set a record in three-cushion billiards. In 2021, Forthomme went into surgery after contracting heart failure, later returning into his profession.

References

External links 

1970 births
Living people
Place of birth missing (living people)
Belgian carom billiards players
Three-cushion billiards players
World champions in three-cushion billiards
World Cup champions in three-cushion billiards